Batocera hlaveki is a species of beetle in the family Cerambycidae. It was described by Rigout in 1988. It is present in Papua New Guinea.

References

Batocerini
Beetles described in 1988